Gennadi Aleksandrovich Bogachyov (born 10 February 1967) is a former Russian professional footballer.

Club career
He made his professional debut in the Soviet Top League in 1986 for FC Spartak Moscow. He played 1 game in the UEFA Cup 1986–87 for FC Spartak Moscow.

Honours
 Soviet Top League bronze: 1986.

References

1967 births
Footballers from Moscow
Living people
Soviet footballers
Russian footballers
Association football defenders
Soviet Top League players
Russian Premier League players
FC Spartak Moscow players
FC Tyumen players
FC SKA Rostov-on-Don players
FC Shinnik Yaroslavl players
FC Rostov players
FC Dynamo Stavropol players
FC Asmaral Moscow players
FC Zvezda Perm players